Arne may refer to:

Places
 Arne, Dorset, England, a village
 Arne RSPB reserve, a nature reserve adjacent to the village
 Arné, Hautes-Pyrénées, Midi-Pyrénées, France
 Arne (Boeotia), an ancient city in Boeotia, Greece
 Arne (Thessaly), an ancient city in Thessaly, Greece
 Arne, or modern Tell Aran, an ancient Arameans city near Aleppo, Syria
 Arne Township, Benson County, North Dakota, United States
 959 Arne, an asteroid

People and fictional and mythological characters
 Arne (name), a given name and a surname, including a list of people and fictional characters with the name
 Arne (Greek myth), three figures in Greek mythology
 half of Arne & Carlos, a Norwegian design duo

See also
 Aarne
 Aarne–Thompson classification systems
 Arn (disambiguation)